Wurtzel is a surname. Notable people with the surname include:

 Adam Wurtzel (born 1985), American television personality
 Elizabeth Wurtzel (1967–2020), American writer and journalist
 Sol M. Wurtzel (1890–1958), American motion picture producer
 Stuart Wurtzel (born 1940), American art director

See also
 Wurzel (disambiguation)